The Ismenius Lacus quadrangle is one of a series of 30 quadrangle maps of Mars used by the United States Geological Survey (USGS) Astrogeology Research Program. The quadrangle is located in the northwestern portion of Mars’ eastern hemisphere and covers 0° to 60° east longitude (300° to 360° west longitude) and 30° to 65° north latitude. The quadrangle uses a Lambert conformal conic projection at a nominal scale of 1:5,000,000 (1:5M). The Ismenius Lacus quadrangle is also referred to as MC-5 (Mars Chart-5). The quadrangle covers an approximate area of 4.9 million square km, or a little over 3% of Mars’ surface area. The Ismenius Lacus quadrangle contains parts of Acidalia Planitia, Arabia Terra, Vastitas Borealis, and Terra Sabaea.

The Ismenius Lacus quadrangle contains Deuteronilus Mensae and Protonilus Mensae, two places that are of special interest to scientists.  They contain evidence of present and past glacial activity.  They also have a landscape unique to Mars, called Fretted terrain.  The largest crater in the area is Lyot Crater, which contains channels probably carved by liquid water.

Origin of names

Ismenius Lacus is the name of a telescopic albedo feature located at 40° N and 30° E on Mars. The term is Latin for Ismenian Lake, and refers to the Ismenian Spring near Thebes in Greece where Cadmus slew the guardian dragon. Cadmus was the legendary founder of Thebes, and had come to the spring to fetch water. The name was approved by the International Astronomical Union (IAU) in 1958.

There appeared to be a large canal in this region called Nilus.  Since 1881–1882 it was split into other canals, some were called Nilosyrtis, Protonilus (first Nile),and Deuteronilus (second Nile).

Physiography and geology
In eastern Ismenius Lacus, lies Mamers Valles, a giant outflow channel.

The channel shown below goes quite a long distance and has branches.  It ends in a depression that may have been a lake at one time.  The first picture is a wide angle, taken with CTX; while the second is a close up taken with HiRISE.

Lyot Crater 
The northern plains are generally flat and smooth with few craters.  However, a few large craters do stand out.  The giant impact crater, Lyot, is easy to see in the northern part of Ismenius Lacus.  Lyot Crater is the deepest point in Mars's northern hemisphere.  One image below of Lyot Crater Dunes shows a variety of interesting forms: dark dunes, light-toned deposits, and Dust Devil Tracks.  Dust devils, which resemble miniature tornados create the tracks by removing a thin, but bright deposit of dust to reveal the darker underlying surface. Light-toned deposits are widely believed to contain minerals formed in water. Research, published in June 2010, described evidence for liquid water in Lyot crater in the past.

Many channels have been found near Lyot Crater.  Research, published in 2017, concluded that the channels were made from water released when the hot ejecta landed on a layer of ice that was 20 to 300 meters thick.  Calculations suggest that the ejecta would have had a temperature of at least 250 degrees Fahrenheit.  The valleys seem to start from beneath the ejecta near the outer edge of the ejecta.  One evidence for this idea is that there are few secondary craters nearby. Few secondary craters were formed because most landed on ice and did not affect the ground below. The ice accumulated in the area when the climate was different.  The tilt or obliquity of the axis changes frequently.  During periods of greater tilt, ice from the poles is redistributed to the mid-latitudes.  The existence of these channels is unusual because although Mars used to have water in rivers, lakes, and an ocean, these features have been dated to the Noachian and Hesperian periods—4 to 3 billion years ago.

Other craters

Impact craters generally have a rim with ejecta around them; in contrast volcanic craters usually do not have a rim or ejecta deposits.  As craters get larger (greater than 10 km in diameter), they usually have a central peak. The peak is caused by a rebound of the crater floor following the impact.  Sometimes craters will display layers in their walls.  Since the collision that produces a crater is like a powerful explosion, rocks from deep underground are tossed unto the surface.  Hence, craters are useful for showing us what lies deep under the surface.

Fretted terrain 

The Ismenius Lacus quadrangle contains several interesting features such as fretted terrain, parts of which are found in Deuteronilus Mensae and Protonilus Mensae.  Fretted terrain contains smooth, flat lowlands along with steep cliffs.  The scarps or cliffs are usually 1 to 2 km high.  Channels in the area have wide, flat floors and steep walls.  Many buttes and mesas are present. In fretted terrain the land seems to transition from narrow straight valleys to isolated mesas. Most of the mesas are surrounded by forms that have been called a variety of names: circum-mesa aprons, debris aprons, rock glaciers, and lobate debris aprons. At first they appeared to resemble rock glaciers on Earth. But scientists could not be sure. Even after the Mars Global Surveyor (MGS) Mars Orbiter Camera (MOC) took a variety of pictures of fretted terrain, experts could not tell for sure if material was moving or flowing as it would in an ice-rich deposit (glacier).  Eventually, proof of their true nature was discovered by radar studies with the Mars Reconnaissance Orbiter showed that they contain pure water ice covered with a thin layer of rocks that insulated the ice.

Glaciers 

Glaciers formed much of the observable surface in large areas of Mars.  Much of the area in high latitudes, especially the Ismenius Lacus quadrangle, is believed to still contain enormous amounts of water ice.  In March 2010, scientists released the results of a radar study of an area called Deuteronilus Mensae that found widespread evidence of ice lying beneath a few meters of rock debris. The ice was probably deposited as snowfall during an earlier climate when the poles were tilted more.  It would be difficult to take a hike on the fretted terrain where glaciers are common because the surface is folded, pitted, and often covered with linear striations.  The striations show the direction of movement.  Much of this rough texture is due to sublimation of buried ice.  The ice goes directly into a gas (this process is called sublimation) and leaves behind an empty space.  Overlying material then collapses into the void.  Glaciers are not pure ice; they contain dirt and rocks.  At times, they will dump their load of materials into ridges.  Such ridges are called moraines.  Some places on Mars have groups of ridges that are twisted around; this may have been due to more movement after the ridges were put into place.  Sometimes chunks of ice fall from the glacier and get buried in the land surface.  When they melt, a more or less round hole remains.  On Earth we call these features kettles or kettle holes. Mendon Ponds Park in upstate New York has preserved several of these kettles.  The picture from HiRISE below shows possible kettles in Moreux Crater.

Latitude dependent mantle
Much of the Martian surface is covered with a thick ice-rich, mantle layer that has fallen from the sky a number of times in the past.

Climate change caused ice-rich features
Many features on Mars, especially ones found in the Ismenius Lacus quadrangle, are believed to contain large amounts of ice.  The most popular model for the origin of the ice is climate change from large changes in the tilt of the planet's rotational axis.  At times the tilt has even been greater than 80 degrees   Large changes in the tilt explains many ice-rich features on Mars.

Studies have shown that when the tilt of Mars reaches 45 degrees from its current 25 degrees, ice is no longer stable at the poles.   Furthermore, at this high tilt, stores of solid carbon dioxide (dry ice) sublimate, thereby increasing the atmospheric pressure.  This increased pressure allows more dust to be held in the atmosphere.  Moisture in the atmosphere will fall as snow or as ice frozen onto dust grains.  Calculations suggest this material will concentrate in the mid-latitudes.  General circulation models of the Martian atmosphere predict accumulations of ice-rich dust in the same areas where ice-rich features are found. When the tilt begins to return to lower values, the ice sublimates (turns directly to a gas) and leaves behind a lag of dust.   The lag deposit caps the underlying material so with each cycle of high tilt levels, some ice-rich mantle remains behind.   Note, that the smooth surface mantle layer probably represents only relative recent material.

Upper Plains Unit

Remnants of a 50–100 meter thick mantling, called the Upper Plains Unit, has been discovered in the mid-latitudes of Mars.  First investigated in the Deuteronilus Mensae region, but it occurs in other places as well.  The remnants consist of sets of dipping layers in craters and along mesas. Sets of dipping layers may be of various sizes and shapes—some look like Aztec pyramids from Central America.

This unit also degrades into brain terrain.  Brain terrain is a region of maze-like ridges 3–5 meters high.  Some ridges may consist of an ice core, so they may be sources of water for future colonists.

Some regions of the upper plains unit display large fractures and troughs with raised rims; such regions are called ribbed upper plains. Fractures are believed to have started with small cracks from stresses.  Stress is suggested to initiate the fracture process since ribbed upper plains are common when debris aprons come together or near the edge of debris aprons—such sites would generate compressional stresses.  Cracks exposed more surfaces, and consequently more ice in the material sublimates into the planet's thin atmosphere. Eventually, small cracks become large canyons or troughs.

Small cracks often contain small pits and chains of pits; these are thought to be from sublimation of ice in the ground. Large areas of the Martian surface are loaded with ice that is protected by a meters thick layer of dust and other material.  However, if cracks appear, a fresh surface will expose ice to the thin atmosphere.  In a short time, the ice will disappear into the cold, thin atmosphere in a process called sublimation.  Dry ice behaves in a similar fashion on the Earth.  On Mars sublimation has been observed when the Phoenix lander uncovered chunks of ice that disappeared in a few days.  In addition, HiRISE has seen fresh craters with ice at the bottom.  After a time, HiRISE saw the ice deposit disappear.

The upper plains unit is thought to have fallen from the sky.  It drapes various surfaces, as if it fell evenly.  As is the case for other mantle deposits, the upper plains unit has layers, is fine-grained, and is ice-rich. It is widespread; it does not seem to have a point source.  The surface appearance of some regions of Mars is due to how this unit has degraded.  It is a major cause of the surface appearance of lobate debris aprons. The layering of the upper plains mantling unit and other mantling units are believed to be caused by major changes in the planet's climate.  Models predict that the obliquity or tilt of the rotational axis has varied from its present 25 degrees to maybe over 80 degrees over geological time.  Periods of high tilt will cause the ice in the polar caps to be redistributed and change the amount of dust in the atmosphere.

Deltas 
Researchers have found a number of examples of deltas that formed in Martian lakes.  Deltas are major signs that Mars once had a lot of water because deltas usually require deep water over a long period of time to form.  In addition, the water level needs to be stable to keep sediment from washing away.  Deltas have been found over a wide geographical range.  Below, is a pictures of a one in the Ismenius Lacus quadrangle.

Pits and cracks 
Some places in the Ismenius Lacus quadrangle display large numbers of cracks and pits.  It is widely believed that these are the result of ground ice sublimating (changing directly from a solid to a gas).  After the ice leaves, the ground collapses in the shape of pits and cracks.  The pits may come first.  When enough pits form, they unite to form cracks.

Mesas formed by ground collapse

Volcanoes under ice
There is evidence that volcanoes sometimes erupt under ice, as they do on Earth at times.  What seems to happen it that much ice melts, the water escapes, and then the surface cracks and collapses.  These exhibit concentric fractures and large pieces of ground that seemed to have been pulled apart.  Sites like this may have recently had held liquid water, hence they may be fruitful places to search for evidence of life.

Exhumed craters

Some features on Mars seem to be in the process of being uncovered.  So, the thought is that they formed, were covered over, and now are being exhumed as material is being eroded.  These features are quite noticeable with craters.  When a crater forms, it will destroy what's under it and leave a rim and ejecta.  In the example below, only part of the crater is visible.  if the crater came after the layered feature, it would have removed part of the feature.

Fractures forming blocks
In places large fractures break up surfaces.  Sometimes straight edges are formed and large cubes are created by the fractures.

Polygonal patterned ground

Polygonal, patterned ground is quite common in some regions of Mars.  It is commonly believed to be caused by the sublimation of ice from the ground. Sublimation is the direct change of solid ice to a gas.  This is similar to what happens to dry ice on the Earth.  Places on Mars that display polygonal ground may indicate where future colonists can find water ice.  Patterned ground forms in a mantle layer, called latitude dependent mantle, that fell from the sky when the climate was different.

Dunes

Sand dunes have been found in many places on Mars.  The presence of dunes shows that the planet has an atmosphere with wind, for dunes require wind to pile up the sand.  Most dunes on Mars are black because of the weathering of the volcanic rock basalt.   Black sand can be found on Earth on Hawaii and on some tropical South Pacific islands.
Sand is common on Mars due to the old age of the surface that has allowed rocks to erode into sand. Dunes on Mars have been observed to move many meters.
Some dunes move along.  In this process, sand moves up the windward side and then falls down the leeward side of the dune, thus caused the dune to go toward the leeward side (or slip face).
When images are enlarged, some dunes on Mars display ripples on their surfaces.   These are caused by sand grains rolling and bouncing up the windward surface of a dune.  The bouncing grains tend to land on the windward side of each ripple.  The grains do not bounce very high so it does not take much to stop them.

Ocean
Many researchers have suggested that Mars once had a great ocean in the north. Much evidence for this ocean has been gathered over several decades.  New evidence was published in May 2016.  A large team of scientists described how some of the surface in Ismenius Lacus quadrangle was altered by two tsunamis.  The tsunamis were caused by asteroids striking the ocean.  Both were thought to have been strong enough to create 30 km diameter craters.  The first tsunami picked up and carried boulders the size of cars or small houses.  The backwash from the wave formed channels by rearranging the boulders.  The second came in when the ocean was 300 m lower.  The second carried a great deal of ice which was dropped in valleys.  Calculations show that the average height of the waves would have been 50 m, but the heights would vary from 10 m to 120 m.  Numerical simulations show that in this particular part of the ocean two impact craters of the size of 30 km in diameter would form every 30 million years.  The implication here is that a great northern ocean may have existed for millions of years.  One argument against an ocean has been the lack of shoreline features.  These features may have been washed away by these tsunami events.  The parts of Mars studied in this research are Chryse Planitia and northwestern Arabia Terra.  These tsunamis affected some surfaces in the Ismenius Lacus quadrangle and in the Mare Acidalium quadrangle.

Gullies

Gullies were thought for a time to have been caused by recent flows of liquid water.  However, further study suggests they are formed today by chunks of dry ice moving down steep slopes.

Layered features

Ring mold craters
Ring Mold Craters are a kind of crater on the planet Mars, that look like the ring molds used in baking. They are believed to be caused by an impact into ice.  The ice is covered by a layer of debris.  They are found in parts of Mars that have buried ice.  Laboratory experiments confirm that impacts into ice result in a "ring mold shape."  They are also bigger than other craters in which an asteroid impacted solid rock. Impacts into ice warm the ice and cause it to flow into the ring mold shape.

Mounds

Channels

Landslide

Other images from Ismenius Lacus quadrangle

Other Mars quadrangles

Interactive Mars map

See also 

 Climate of Mars
 Deuteronilus Mensae 
 Dunes
 Fretted terrain
 Glacier
 Glaciers on Mars 
 Gully (Mars)
 HiRISE
 Impact crater
 List of quadrangles on Mars
 Lobate debris apron
 Lyot Crater
 Polygonal patterned ground
 Protonilus Mensae
 Ring mold crater
 Upper Plains Unit
 Vallis 
 Water on Mars

References

External links 

 Martian Ice – Jim Secosky – 16th Annual International Mars Society Convention
 https://www.youtube.com/watch?v=kpnTh3qlObk T. Gordon Wasilewski - Water on Mars - 20th Annual International Mars Society Convention  Describes how to get water from ice in the ground
  - Jeffrey Plaut - Subsurface Ice - 21st Annual International Mars Society Convention-2018

 
Mars